Stagsden is a small but historic village and civil parish located in the Borough of Bedford, northwest Bedfordshire, England, near the Buckinghamshire border.

The village has at its centre St. Leonard's Church, where High Street, Bedford Road and Church Lane all meet. Toward the western end of the village, along High Street, is the Royal George pub (now closed) and the Village Hall (formerly the primary school). The village's history is well preserved, and several millennium projects centred on such preservation for future generations.

In 2000, Stagsden acquired two new additions to village life. A Millennium bench was put in place at the corner of Bedford Road and the High Street, and Bedfordshire Golf Club opened its newly built course on the hillside facing the village, on the other side of the A422.

A latecomer to the 21st century is the village sign, next to the church, which is a quintessentially rural affair and is rather splendid.

For electoral purposes the village is part of Turvey ward and is represented on Bedford Borough Council by Mark Smith, elected in May 2007.

Half a mile east of Stagsden and inside the parish boundary is Hanger Wood, an ancient woodland and Site of Special Scientific Interest.

Stagsden is home to the British Tripod Brand, 3 Legged Thing. The brand stamps the name "Stagsden" onto each and every product that they manufacture as a tribute to the village. 3 Legged Thing is situated in two Chicken Sheds ( Shedquarters [Unit 9] & Return of the Shedi [Unit 10] ), on the site of Kinsbourne Farm, Bury End, previously a poultry farm that was home to over 30,000 chickens.

References

Villages in Bedfordshire
Civil parishes in Bedfordshire
Borough of Bedford